Needles Airport  is a county-owned public airport in San Bernardino County, California, United States, five miles (9 km) south of  Needles.

It opened in May 1941. During World War II the airfield was known as Needles Army Airfield and was used by the United States Army Air Forces Fourth Air Force. With the end of the war the base returned to civil control.

Facilities and aircraft 
It has two asphalt runways: 2/20 is 4,235 by 100 feet (1,291 x 30 m) and 11/29 is 5,005 by 100 feet.

In the year ending February 17, 2006 the airport had 10,500 general aviation aircraft operations, an average of 28 per day. 8 aircraft were then based at this airport: 62.5% single-engine and 37.5% ultralight.

See also 

 California World War II Army Airfields

References

External links 
 Needles Airport at San Bernardino County website
 Aerial image as of 21 May 1994 from USGS The National Map
 

Airports in San Bernardino County, California
Mojave Desert
Airfields of the United States Army Air Forces in California
World War II airfields in the United States
Military facilities in the Mojave Desert
Needles Airport